Lê Thanh Thúy (born May 23, 1995) is a member of the Vietnam women's national volleyball team.

Clubs 
  Hà Nội VC (2005 – 2011)
  Vietsov Petro (2012 – 2013)
  Vietinbank VC (2014 – 2021)
  Ninh Bình Doveco (2022 – present)

Awards

Individuals 
2014 VTV Binh Dien International Cup "Miss Volleyball"
2014 VTV International Cup "Miss Volleyball"
2016 VTV International Cup "Best Middle Blocker"

Clubs
 2013 Vietnam League -  Bronze medal, with Vietsov Petro
 2014 Vietnam League -  Bronze medal, with Vietinbank VC
 2015 Vietnam League -  Runner-Up, with Vietinbank VC
 2016 Vietnam League -  Champion, with Vietinbank VC
 2017 Vietnam League -  Bronze medal, with Vietinbank VC
 2018 Vietnam League -  Bronze medal, with Vietinbank VC
 2019 Vietnam League -  Runner-Up, with Vietinbank VC

References

Vietnamese women's volleyball players
1995 births
Living people
People from Haiphong
Vietnam women's international volleyball players
Southeast Asian Games silver medalists for Vietnam
Southeast Asian Games bronze medalists for Vietnam
Southeast Asian Games medalists in volleyball
Competitors at the 2017 Southeast Asian Games
Volleyball players at the 2018 Asian Games
Asian Games competitors for Vietnam
Middle blockers
21st-century Vietnamese women